In mathematics, the Scott core theorem is a theorem about the finite presentability of fundamental groups of 3-manifolds due to G. Peter Scott, .  The precise statement is as follows:

Given a 3-manifold (not necessarily compact) with finitely generated fundamental group, there is a compact three-dimensional submanifold, called the compact core or Scott core, such that its inclusion map induces an isomorphism on fundamental groups.  In particular, this means a finitely generated 3-manifold group is finitely presentable.

References

3-manifolds
Theorems in group theory
Theorems in topology